WHFS may refer to: 

 WHFS (AM), a radio station (1010 AM) licensed to serve Seffner, Florida, United States
 WHFS (historic), a group of radio stations in the Baltimore/Washington D.C. area formerly licensed as WHFS
 WPBB, a radio station (98.7 FM) licensed to serve Holmes Beach, Florida, United States, that held the callsign WHFS-FM from 2012 to 2015
 WUUB, a radio station (106.3 FM) licensed to serve Jupiter, Florida, United States, that held the callsign WHFS from 2011 to 2012